Pat Pfeifer Park is a  public park in Gresham, Oregon, United States.

References

External links

 

Gresham, Oregon
Parks in Oregon